Shinji Harada (Harada Shinji、原田真二) is a  famous pop music artist in Japan, born in Hiroshima, on December 5, 1958.

After three years of practicing guitar, at the age of fifteen he was ready to play guitar with the band Yamaha.

Harada became a musical sensation in Japan when he released his debut single Teens' Blues on October 25, 1977 when he was 18 years old. He released two more singles, Candy in November and Shadow Boxer in December same year. All three singles ranked within the top 20 in the Oricon chart simultaneously, which had never happened before. The debut album Feel Happy  was to become number one in the first week of release in Japan in 1978. A documentary film about him, Our Song, was made in 1978.  Harada has been prolific, releasing more than 70 singles from 1977 to 2015.

Harada is just as prolific a songwriter, having written or composed for Koji Kikkawa, Junko Yagami, Anri, Hiromi Go, Akina Nakamori, AND many more artists.

His song 'Time Travel' from the album 'Feel Happy' was covered by Spitz. Spitz's 'Time Travel' was used in the famous 2011 Japanese drama Boku to Star no 99 Nichi starring Hidetoshi Nishijima and Kim Tae Hee.

Discography 
 Feel Happy (1978)
  Natural High (1979)
 The Best Collection (1980)
 Entrance (1981)
 Light Collection (1983)
 Save Our Soul　(1983.7.21)
 Modern Vision (1984)
 Magical Healing (1985)
 Doing Wonders (1986)
 Urban game (1988.11.21)
 Absolute Singles (1988)
 Absolute Mix (1988)
 Just Urban Night (1989)
 Kindness (1991)
 Miracle Love (1992.11.21)
 Make it a Paradise (1993.9.21) 　COLUMBIA
 The World of Shinji Harada (1998)
 Urban Angels 2004 (2004.12.5) 　Shine Records
 Harmoney～Bokurano Harmony～(mini album)　　(2005.10.25)
 Feel Happy 〜Debut 30th Anniversary〜 (2007.10.24) FORLIFE
 Feel Free (2007) Roppongi WAVE

External links
 Shinji Harada Official Website
 Gentle Earth: Shinji Harada's non-profit organization

1958 births
Japanese pop musicians
Living people
Musicians from Hiroshima Prefecture